Princess Deokhye of Korea (Korean: 덕혜옹주, Deokhye-Ongju; Japanese: 徳恵姫, Tokue-hime; 25 May 191221 April 1989) was the last princess of the Korean Empire.

She was born on May 25, 1912, at Changdeok Palace, in Seoul, as the youngest daughter of Emperor Gojong from his concubine, then known as Yang Gwi-in. After her birth, Gojong bestowed the royal title Boknyeong on Lady Yang.

Deokhye was not formally recognized as a princess by Japan until 1917, because she was not the daughter of a Queen. In 1917, her name was formally entered into the Imperial Family's registry. Her father loved her greatly and established the Deoksugung Kindergarten for her in Junmyungdang (준명당), Hamnyeong Hall. Girls her age from noble families attended the kindergarten.

In Korea, she is called Deokhye Ongju, not Gongju. Gongju refers to the daughters of the Queen, and Ongju refers to the daughters of concubines.

Birth and early life
Yi Deok-hye was born as the daughter of Yang Gwiin (later Lady Boknyeong) and the then-60-year-old Emperor Emeritus Gojong on May 25, 1912, nearly two years after the Japanese annexation of Korea.  Immediately after birth, she was called Agi (아기, 阿只, meaning "baby") and then named Deok-hye. Her mother was a low-ranking court lady working in the kitchen of Deoksugung. Gojong had 16 children with his 10 wives, but Deok-hye was his first daughter; his four other daughters were not counted as they all died under the age of one. Gojong was delighted with the birth of his first daughter and raised her with meticulous love. In 1916, he established the Deoksugung Kindergarten dedicated to her, where Deok-hye would attend. However, apart from her father, because she didn't have an official title, she was ignored and treated like she did not exist. Later, she was nicknamed "Boknyeong-dang".

In 1917, her father persuaded Terauchi Masatake, the then-ruling Governor-General of Korea, to enter her name into the registry of the Imperial Family, offering her legitimacy and granting her the title of princess.

In 1919, Emperor Gojong planned a secret engagement between Princess Deokhye and Kim Jang-han, the nephew of Kim Hwang-jin, a court chamberlain. He had sought to protect his daughter through it, but the engagement failed due to Japan's intervention and Kim Hwang-jin was not permitted to enter Deoksu Palace again. Emperor Gojong died suddenly on January 21, 1919.

In 1921, Princess Deokhye started going to Hinodae Elementary School, in Seoul.

Life in Japan and arranged marriage

In 1925, the Princess was taken to Japan under the pretense of continuing her studies. Like her brothers, she attended the Gakushuin, where Yukika Sohma was among her schoolmates. In Japan she was known as Princess Tokue (徳恵姫, Tokue-hime). According to Yukika, she was untalkative and struggled with exercising.

Upon the news of her mother's death in 1929, Deokhye was finally given permission to visit Korea temporarily, in order to attend the funeral. However, she was not allowed to wear the proper clothing.

In the Spring of 1930, upon the onset of a psychological condition (manifested by sleepwalking), she moved to King Yi's Palace, the Tokyo house of her brother, Crown Prince Eun. During this period, she often forgot to eat and drink. Her physician diagnosed her illness as precocious dementia (today called schizophrenia), but by the following year, her condition seemed to have improved. This may be attributed to her upbringing.

In May 1931, after "matchmaking" by Empress Teimei, the consort of Emperor Taishō of Japan, Princess Deokhye married Count Sō Takeyuki (武志; 1908–1985), a Japanese aristocrat. The marriage had in fact been decided in 1930. Her brother had protested against it, and it had been postponed because of her condition, but when she recovered, she was immediately given instructions that the wedding was to take place.

She gave birth to a daughter, Masae, or Jeonghye in Korea, on August 14, 1932. In 1933, Deokhye was again experiencing mental illness, and after this, she spent many years in various mental health clinics.

With the defeat of Japan in World War II, Korea once again became independent and her husband lost his noble title, as the Japanese peerage was abolished.

Her daughter, Masae, graduated from Waseda University's Department of Literature and met Suzuki Noboru, whom she married in 1955. Her son-in-law would eventually take on her husband’s last name as the heir to the family.

As Deokhye continued to be in a poor health condition, and after having permission from Crown Prince Uimin, Sō Takeyuki eventually divorced in 1955; he later remarried to a Japanese woman named Yoshie Katsumura who he had three children with.

Having suffered an unhappy marriage, Deokhye's grief was compounded by the loss of her only daughter, who disappeared on 26 August 1956, reportedly committing suicide due to the stress of her parents' divorce. Her daughter’s suicide note was found in the mountains. As a result, Deokhye's condition deteriorated at a slow yet considerable pace.

Return to Korea
She returned to Korea at the invitation of the South Korean government on January 26, 1962, after 37 years. At first, the Korean government refused to allow the return of the last royal bloodline, because President Rhee Syng-man wanted to avoid political chaos. However, reporter Kim Eul-han found the princess and persuaded the government to allow her return. She cried while approaching her motherland, and despite her mental state, accurately remembered the complex royal court etiquette and protocol. 

The princess reunited with her kindergarten and elementary school classmate, Min Yong-ah (민용아, 閔龍兒), and her 72-year-old wet nurse, Byeon Bok-dong (변복동, 卞福童), when they went to pick her up at Gimpo Airport. After meeting her sister-in-law, Empress Sunjeonghyo, the second wife of her older half-brother Emperor Sunjong, she was admitted to Seoul National University Hospital in later that day for surgery to remove a polyp in the uterus.

Despite being born in Korea, the princess was able to restore her Korean citizenship and finalized her name, Yi Deok-hye, on 8 February 1962, and was soon discharged from the hospital as her condition was proven stable on 4 May 1964. In the fall of 1968, she lived in Nakseon Hall, Changdeok Palace, with Prince Uimin and Princess Masako, their son Prince Gu, his wife Julia Mullock, and Mrs. Byeon Bok-dong.

Sometime before her death, around ten years before, her ex-husband flew from Japan to Korea to visit her and see how she’s doing, but this visit was rejected by her family. 

He begged Yi Gong-jae, a member of the family, to let him meet his ex-wife. But Yi said, "I can't forgive him for having an unwanted arranged marriage with King Gojong's daughter (a marriage that the head of the family or parental authority orders regardless of the person's will for their own benefit or purpose), eventually putting the princess in a psychiatric hospital and getting a divorce. The princess doesn't even have anything to talk about meeting him, and there's no reason for him to meet. If she met you, she would think of the past and make her condition worse. So, people like you are not allowed to visit at all, so please go back”.

Her last years were filled with visits to different hospitals, but on 24 May 1983, she was admitted and stayed temporarily at Hallym University Hangang Sacred Heart Hospital due to her old age. 

The princess died on 21 April 1989, at Sugang Hall, Changdeok Palace, and was buried at Hongryureung in Namyangju, near where her father, Emperor Gojong, and older half-brother, Emperor Sunjong, were buried.

Family 
 Father
 Emperor Gojong of Korea (8 September 1852 – 21 January 1919) (대한제국 고종)
 Grandmother - Grand Internal Princess Consort Sunmok of the Yeoheung Min clan (3 February 1818 – 8 January 1898) (순목부대부인 민씨)
 Grandfather - Yi Ha-eung, Grand Internal Prince Heungseon (21 December 1820 – 22 February 1898) (이하응 흥선대원군)
 Mother
 Yang Chun-gi, Imperial Consort Boknyeong Gwi-in of the Cheongju Yang clan (27 September 1882 – 30 May 1929) (양춘기 복녕당 귀인 양씨)
 Grandfather - Yang Eon-hwan (양언환, 梁彦煥)
 Husband
 Count Sō Takeyuki (16 February 1908 - 22 April 1985) (소 다케유키, 宗武志)
 Father-in-law - Sō Yoriyuki (소 요리유키) later, Kuroda Yoriyuki (구로다 요리유키, 黒田和志) (8 September 1851 – 21 January 1917)
 Mother-in-law - Kuroda Reiko (구로다 레이코, 黒 鏻子) (? – 1925)
 Daughter
 Countess Sō Masae (소 마사에, 宗正惠), or So Jeonghye (소 정혜) (14 August 1932 – 1956)
 Son-in-law: Sō Noboru (5 September 1931 - ) (소 노보루, 宗昇)

In popular culture

Film and television
 Portrayed by Son Ye-jin in the 2016 film The Last Princess.

Literature
 A biography of Princess Deokhye was published by Japanese author Yasuko Honma (本馬恭子) and was subsequently translated into Korean by Hoon Lee and published in 1996.
 The best-selling novel Princess Deokhye by Kwon Bi-young was published in 2009.

Music
 Singer Ho Shim-nam created a 1963 song based upon the life of Princess Deokhye.
 Korean singer Heo Jinsul's 2010 song "The Rose of Tears" is based upon the life of Princess Deokhye, and was recorded in both English and Korean.

Theater
 In 1995, a play based upon Princess Deokhye was held at the Seoul Art Center.
 The 2013 Korean musical Deokhye, the Last Princess is based upon her life.

Ancestors

See also
History of Korea
Rulers of Korea

References

External links

1912 births
1989 deaths
Princesses of Joseon
House of Yi
Gakushuin University alumni
People with schizophrenia
Royalty and nobility with disabilities
Daughters of emperors
People from Seoul